Afro-Cubans or Black Cubans are Cubans of sub-Saharan African ancestry. The term Afro-Cuban can also refer to historical or cultural elements in Cuba thought to emanate from this community and the combining of native African and other cultural elements found in Cuban society such as race, religion, music, language, the arts and class culture.

Demographics

According to a 2012 national census which surveyed 11.2 million Cubans, 1 million Cubans described themselves as Afro-Cuban or Black, while 3 million considered themselves to be "mulatto" or "mestizo". Thus a significant proportion of those living on the island affirm some African ancestry. Although, there has been much discussion over the actual demographic composition of the island. While the 2012 national census showed that only 11% of Cubans reported themselves to be Afro-Cuban or Black, most international sources and independent studies have shown that the proportion of Cubans who are black or who have significant African genetic heritage is higher. A study by the University of Miami  estimated that number to be 62%, noting that complex attitudes towards racial identification, and the de facto racial hierarchy that has existed on the island, have influenced lower figures. The matter is further complicated by the fact that a fair number of people still locate their origins in specific native African ethnic groups or regions, particularly the Yoruba (or Lucumí), Akan, Arará and Kongo, but also Igbo, Carabalí, Mandingo, Kissi, Fula, Makua and others.

A study from 2014 estimated the genetic admixture of the population of Cuba to be 72% European, 20% African and 8% Native American.

Although Afro-Cubans can be found throughout Cuba, Eastern Cuba has a higher concentration of Afro-Cubans than other parts of the island and Havana has the largest population of Afro-Cubans of any city in Cuba. Recently, many native African immigrants have been coming to Cuba, especially from Angola. Also, immigrants from Jamaica and Haiti have been settling in Cuba, most of whom settle in the eastern part of the island, due to its proximity to their home countries, further contributing to the already high percentage of blacks on that side of the island.
	
The percentage of Afro-Cubans on the island increased after the 1959 Cuban revolution led by Fidel Castro due to mass migration from the island of the largely white Cuban professional class. A small percentage of Afro-Cubans left Cuba, mostly for the United States (particularly Florida), where they and their U.S.-born children are known as Afro-Cuban Americans, Cuban Americans, Hispanic Americans and African Americans. Only a few of them resided in nearby Spanish-speaking country of Dominican Republic and the U.S. territory of Puerto Rico.

The Minority Rights Group International says that "An objective assessment of the situation of Afro-Cubans remains problematic due to scant records and a paucity of systematic studies both pre- and post-revolution".

Afro-Cuban descendants in Africa
African countries such as Nigeria, the home of the Yoruba cultures and Spanish Guinea experienced an influx of ex-slaves from Cuba brought there as indentured servants during the 17th century and again during the 19th century. In Spanish Guinea, they became part of the Emancipados; in Nigeria, they were called Amaros.  Despite being free to return to Cuba when their tenure was over, they remained in these countries marrying into the local indigenous population. The former slaves were brought to Africa by the Royal Orders of September 13, 1845 (by way of voluntary arrangement) and a June 20, 1861, deportation from Cuba, due to the lack of volunteers. Similar circumstances previously occurred during the 17th century where ex-slaves from both Cuba and Brazil were offered the same opportunity.

Angola also has communities of Afro-Cubans, Amparos. They are descendants of Afro-Cuban soldiers brought to the country in 1975 as a result of the Cuban involvement in the Cold War. Fidel Castro deployed thousands of troops to the country during the Angolan Civil War. As a result of this era, there exists a small Spanish-speaking community in Angola of Afro-Cubans numbering about 100,000.

Haitian-Cubans

Haitian Creole language and culture first entered Cuba with the arrival of Haitian immigrants at the start of the 19th century. Haiti was then the French colony of Saint-Domingue and the final years of the 1791–1804 Haitian Revolution brought a wave of French settlers fleeing with their Haitian slaves to Cuba. They came mainly to the east, and especially Guantánamo, where the French later introduced sugar cultivation, constructed sugar refineries and developed coffee plantations. By 1804, some 30,000 Frenchmen were living in Baracoa and Maisí, the furthest eastern municipalities of the province. Later, Haitians continued to come to Cuba to work as braceros (Spanish for "manual laborers") in the fields cutting cane. Their living and working conditions were not much better than slavery. Although they planned to return to Haiti, most stayed on in Cuba. For years, many Haitians and their descendants in Cuba did not identify themselves as such or speak Creole. In the eastern part of the island, many Haitians suffered discrimination. Classes in Creole are offered in Guantanamo, Matanzas and the City of Havana. There is a Creole-language radio program.

Religion

Afro-Cubans are predominantly Roman Catholic, with minorities of Protestant. Afro-Cuban religion can be broken down into three main currents: Santería, Palo Monte and include individuals of all origins. Santería is syncretized with Roman Catholicism.

Music

Since the mid-19th century, innovations within Cuban music have been attributed to the Afro-Cuban community. Genres such as son, conga, mambo and chachachá combined European influences with sub-Saharan African elements. Cuban music evolved markedly away from the traditional European model towards improvisational African traditions. Afro-Cuban musicians have taken pre-existing genres such as trova, country and rap and added their own realities of life in a socialist country and as black persons. Genres like Nueva Trova are seen as live representations of the revolution and have been affected by Afro-Cuban musicians like Pablo Milanes who included African spirituals in his early repertory. Music in Cuba is encouraged both as a scholarly exercise and a popular enjoyment. To Cubans, music and study of it are integral parts of the revolution. Audiences are proud of mixed ethnicity that makes up the music from the Afro-Cuban community, despite there being a boundary of distrust and uncertainty between Cubans and Afro-Cuban culture.

Afro-Cuban music can be divided into religious and profane. Religious music includes the chants, rhythms and instruments used in rituals of the religious currents mentioned above. Profane music includes rumba, guaguancó, comparsa (carnival music) and lesser styles such as the tumba francesa. Virtually all Cuban music is influenced by African rhythms. Cuban popular music, and much of the art music, combines influences from Spain and Africa in ways unique to Cuba. For example son combines African instruments and playing styles with the meter and rhythm of Spanish poetic forms. While much of the music is performed in cut-time, artists typically use an array of time signatures like 6/8 for drumming beats. On the other hand, clave uses a polymetric 7/8 + 5/8 time signature.

Afro-Cuban arts emerged in the early 1960s with musicians spearheading an amateur movement bringing African-influenced drumming to the forefront of Cuban music. For example, Enrique Bonne's drumming ensembles took inspiration from Cuban folklore, traditional trova, dance music, and American Jazz. Pello de Afrokan created a new dance rhythm called Mozambique that increased in popularity after his predominantly afro-Cuban folklore troupe performed in 1964.

Before the revolution, authorities considered Afro-Cuban religious music a lesser culture; religious drummers were persecuted and instruments were confiscated. After the revolution, Afro-Cuban music could be practiced more openly, but authorities were suspicious due to its relation to Afro-Cuban religions. The first revolutionary institution created for the performing "national folklore" (Afro-Cuban artistic traditions) was Conjunto Folklórico Nacional. Despite official institutional support from the Castro's regime, Afro-Cuban music was treated mostly with ambivalence throughout the second half of the 20th century. Audiences looked down on traditional and religious Afro-Cuban music as primitive and anti-revolutionary, music educators continued pre-revolutionary indifference toward afro-Cuban folklore, and the religious nature of Afro-Cuban music led to criticisms of the government's whitening and de-Africanization of the music. Religious concerts declined, musical instruments related to Santería were confiscated and destroyed, afro-Cuban celebrations were banned outright, and strict limits were placed on the quantity of religious music heard on the radio and television. These attitudes softened in the 1970s and 1980s as the afro-Cuban community began to fuse religious elements into their music. In the 1990s, Afro-Cuban music became a mainstay of Cuba's tourism economy. Members of religious groups earned their living by performing and teaching ritual drumming, song, and dance, to tourists visiting the country.

Rap was adopted in 1999 and solidified with the rise of hip-hop group Orishas. Cuban hip-hop focused on criticism of the Cuban state and the global economic order, including racism, colonialism, imperialism, and global capitalism.

Language
Other cultural elements considered to be Afro-Cuban can be found in language (including syntax, vocabulary, and style of speech).

The Afro-Cuban religions all maintain some degree of use of African languages. Santería and Abakuá both have large parts of their liturgy in African languages (Lucumí and Ñañigo, respectively) while Palo uses a mixture of Spanish and Kikongo, known as Habla Congo.

Racial consciousness

According to anthropologists dispatched by the European Union, racism is entrenched in Cuba. Afro-Cubans are systematically excluded from positions in tourism-related jobs, where they could earn tips in hard currencies. According to the EU study, Afro-Cubans are relegated to poor housing, and African Cubans are excluded from managerial positions.

Enrique Patterson, an afro-Cuban journalist and former University of Havana professor of marxist philosophy, describes race as a "social bomb" and says that "If the Cuban government were to permit Afro-Cubans to organize and raise their problems before [authorities] ... totalitarianism would fall". Esteban Morales Domínguez, a professor at the University of Havana, says that "The absence of the debate on the racial problem already threatens ... the revolution's social project". Carlos Moore, who has written extensively on the issue, says that "There is an unstated threat, Afro-cubans in Cuba know that whenever you raise race in Cuba, you go to jail. Therefore the struggle in Cuba is different. There cannot be a civil rights movement. You will have instantly 10,000 black people dead. [...] The government is frightened to the extent to which it does not understand African Cubans today. You have a new generation of Afro-Cubans who are looking at politics in another way." Barack Obama's victory has raised disturbing questions about the institutional racism in Cuba. The Economist noted "The danger starts with his example: after all, a young, Afro-cuban, progressive politician has no chance of reaching the highest office in Cuba, although a majority of the island's people are of mostly African descent"

In the years between the triumph of the revolution and the victory at Playa Girón the Cuban government was one of the world's most proactive regimes in the fight against discrimination.  It achieved significant gains in racial equality through a series of egalitarian reforms early in the 1960s. Fidel Castro's first public address on racism after his rise to power was on March 23, 1959, at a labor rally in Havana, less than three months after he defeated Fulgencio Batista. He is quoted as saying: "One of the most just battles that must be fought, a battle that must be emphasized more and more, which I might call the fourth battle--the battle to end racial discrimination at work centers. I repeat: the battle to end racial discrimination at work centers. Of all the forms of racial discrimination the worst is the one that limits the colored Cuban's access to jobs. " Castro pointed to the distinction between social segregation and employment, while placing great emphasis on correcting the latter. In response to the large amount of racism that existed in the job market, Castro issued anti-discrimination laws. In addition, he attempted to close the class gap between wealthy white Cubans and Afro-Cubans with a massive literacy campaign among other egalitarian reforms in the early and mid-1960s.
Two years after his 1959 speech at the Havana Labor Rally, Castro declared that the age of racism and discrimination was over. In a speech given at the Confederation of Cuban Workers in observance of May Day, Castro declared that the "just laws of the revolution ended unemployment, put an end to villages without hospitals and schools, enacted laws which ended discrimination, control by monopolies, humiliation, and the suffering of the people." Although inspiring, many would consider the claim to be premature."

Research conducted by Yesilernis Peña, Jim Sidanius and Mark Sawyer in 2003, suggests that social discrimination is still prevalent, despite the low levels of economic discrimination.
After considering the issue solved, the Cuban government moved beyond the issue of racism.  His message marked a shift in Cuban society's perception of racism that was triggered by the change in government focus."  The government's announcement easily allowed the Cuban public to deny discrimination without first correcting the stereotypes that remained in the minds of those who grew up in a Cuba that was racially and economically divided. Many who argue that racism does not exist in Cuba base their claims on the idea of Latin American Exceptionalism. According to the argument of Latin American Exceptionality, a social history of intermarriage and mixing of the races is unique to Latina America. The large mestizo populations that result from high levels of interracial union common to Latin America are often linked to racial democracy. For many Cubans this translates into an argument of "racial harmony", often referred to as racial democracy. In the case of Cuba, ideas of Latin American Exceptionalism have delayed the progress of true racial harmony.

In spite of all the promises and speeches by government leaders, racial discrimination against Afro-Cubans continues to be a major Human Rights issue for the Cuban government, even resulting in riots in Central Havana, a mostly black neighborhood in the capital.

Most of the Latin population of Tampa in the 1950s was working class and lived in restricted areas, ethnic enclaves in the vicinity of Tampa's hundreds of cigar factories. African Cubans were tolerated to an extent in the Latin quarter (where most neighborhoods and cigar factories were integrated). Ybor City and its counterpart, West Tampa, were areas that bordered on other restricted sections-areas for U.S. blacks or whites only. In this Latin quarter, there existed racial discrimination despite its subtleness.

Afrocubanismo

During the 1920s and 1930s Cuba experienced a movement geared towards Afro-Cuban culture called Afrocubanismo. The movement had a large impact on Cuban literature, poetry, painting, music, and sculpture.  It was the first artistic campaign in Cuba that focused on one particular theme: African culture.  Specifically it highlighted the struggle for independence from Spain, African slavery, and building a purely Cuban national identity.  Its goal was to incorporate African folklore and rhythm into traditional modes of art.

History of the movement
The movement evolved from an interest in the rediscovery of African heritage.  It developed in two very different and parallel stages.  One stage stemmed from European artists and intellectuals who were interested in African art and musical folk forms. This stage paralleled the Harlem Renaissance in New York, Négritude in the French Caribbean, and coincided with stylistic European Vanguard (like Cubism and its representation of African masks).  It was characterized by the participation of white intellectuals such as Cubans Alejo Carpentier, Rómulo Lachatañeré, Fortunato Vizcarrondo, Fernando Ortiz and Lydia Cabrera, Puerto Rican Luis Palés Matos and Spaniards Pablo Picasso and Roger de Lauria.  The African-inspired art tended to represent Afro-Cubans with cliché images such as a black man sitting beneath a palm tree with a cigar.

Poems and essays by Afro-Cuban writers began to be published in the 1930s in newspapers, magazines and books, where they discussed their own personal heritage.  Afro-Cuban and Afro-Cuban heritage artists such as Nicolás Guillén, Alberto Arredondo and Emilio Ballagas brought light to the once-marginalized African race and culture.  It became a symbol of empowerment and individuality for Afro-Cubans within the established Western culture of the Americas.

This empowerment became a catalyst for the second stage to be characterized by Afro-Cuban artists making art that truly reflected what it meant to be Afro-Cuban. Beginning in the 1930s this stage depicted a more serious view of black culture like African religions and the struggles associated with slavery.  The main protagonist during this stage of the movement was Nicolás Guillén.

Results of the movement
The lasting reputation of the Afrocubanismo movement was the establishment of a New World art form that used aesthetics from both European and African culture. Although the actual movement of Afrocubanismo faded by the early 1940s, Afro-Cuban culture continues to play a vital role in the identity of Cuba.  It has been the Cuban Revolution that opened up a space for extended research of African ethnic roots in Cuba. The rhetoric of the Revolution incorporates black history and its contribution as an important stratum of Cuban identity.  The Revolution has funded many projects that restore the work of Afro-Cubans in an effort to accommodate an African-driven identity within the new anti-racist Cuban society.

Notable Afro-Cubans

Arts and entertainment
Carlos Acosta - dancer
Laz Alonso - actor
Renny Arozarena - actor
Gastón Baquero - poet
Matt Cedeño - actor and model
Celia Cruz - singer
Sammy Davis Jr - singer, dancer, actor
Rosario Dawson - actress
Ángel Escobar - poet
Lola Falana - actress, singer and dancer
Rome Flynn- actor
Sara Gómez - filmmaker 
Nicolás Guillén - poet
Nestor Hernández - photographer
Georgina Herrera - poet
Wifredo Lam - artist
Coco López - artist 
Faizon Love - actor 
Mellow Man Ace - rapper
Nancy Morejón - poet
Luis Moro - actor and filmmaker
Gina Torres - actress
Alexis Valdés - artist and comedian
Soledad O’Brien - journalist
Karamo Brown

Music
Afro-Cuban All Stars
Francisco Aguabella — percussionist
Federico A. "Tata Güines" Soto Alejo — percussionist and bandleader
Carlos Alfonso — bassist and leader of Síntesis
X Alfonso — singer
Alfredo "Chocolate" Armenteros — trumpeter and bandleader; cousin of Benny Moré
Guillermo Barreto — percussionist with Israel "Cachao" López 
Abelardo Barroso — singer and bandleader 
Mario Bauzá — musician and songwriter; brother-in-law of Machito 
Ignacio Berroa — percussionist
Leo Brouwer — composer and guitarist
Descemer Bueno — singer, composer and record producer
Christina Milian — singer-songwriter, actress 
Cándido Camero — percussionist
Humberto Cané — tres player and singer with Sonora Matancera; son of Valentín Cané 
"Changuito" — percussionist and former member of Los Van Van
Félix Chappottín — trumpeter and bandleader; when Arsenio Rodríguez left Cuba never to return he handed over to him leadership of his group 
Julito Collazo — percussionist and singer
Celia Cruz — singer
Anga Díaz — percussionist and former member of Irakere
Barbarito Diez — singer
Addys D'Mercedes — singer
Richard Egües — flute player, a member of Orquesta Aragón
Ibrahim Ferrer — singer (Buena Vista Social Club)
Juan de Marcos González — musical director of the Buena Vista Social Club
Rubén González — pianist (Conjunto de Arsenio Rodríguez and Buena Vista Social Club)
Graciela — singer; stepsister of Machito
Francisco Raúl "Machito" Gutiérrez Grillo — singer, musician, and bandleader 
Marcelino "Rapindey" Guerra — singer  and composer 
Orlando "Cascarita" Guerra — singer 
Amaury Gutiérrez — singer
Óscar Hernández — songwriter; known for  his lyrics "Ella y yo" and "La rosa roja;" cousin of Alberto Arredondo's mother
Generoso "Tojo" Jiménez — trombonist
Enrique Jorrín — violinist, composer, and inventor of the cha-cha-chá rhythm 
Pedro Knight — trumpeter with Sonora Matancera, second husband, manager after 1967, and eventual widower of Celia Cruz
Xiomara Laugart — singer
Calixto Leicea — trumpeter, songwriter, and arranger with Sonora Matancera
Pío Leyva — singer-songwriter (Buena Vista Social Club)
Olivia Longott — singer
Israel "Cachao" López — bassist, composer, and bandleader, creator of the mambo and the first to record Cuban jam sessions (descargas)
Orestes "Macho" López — pianist and songwriter; brother of Cachao
Orlando "Cachaíto" López — bassist (Buena Vista Social Club); nephew of Cachao and Macho
Antonio Machín — singer and bandleader 
Kalimba Marichal — Mexican-born singer, actor, and athlete
Rita Marley — singer, humanitarian, and widow of Bob Marley
Cheo Marquetti — singer and bandleader
Luis Marquetti — composer; cousin of Cheo Marquetti
Mellow Man Ace — rapper
Celeste Mendoza — singer 
Pablo Milanés — singer
Christina Milián — singer 
Rita Montaner — singer, pianist and actress 
Benny Moré — singer and bandleader; cousin of Alfredo "Chocolate" Armenteros
Fats Navarro — jazz musician
Bola de Nieve — singer and pianist
Armando Peraza — percussionist
Ignacio Piñeiro — musician, bandleader, and composer  
Omara Portuondo — singer (Buena Vista Social Club)
Luciano "Chano" Pozo — Afro-Cuban/jazz percussionist, composer, and bandleader 
Dámaso Pérez Prado — "the king of mambo," composer, and the creator of the bachata rhythm, a variant of the guaracha
Francisco "Compay Segundo" Repilado — singer (Dúo Los Compadres, Grupo de Compay Segundo, and Buena Vista Social Club), composer and bandleader
Orlando "Puntilla" Ríos — percussionist, singer, and bandleader 
Arsenio Rodríguez — musician, bandleader, and songwriter
Yotuel Romero — singer
Lázaro Ros — singer
Gonzalo Rubalcaba — jazz pianist
Ramón "Mongo" Santamaría — musician, songwriter, and bandleader
Ramón "Monguito el Único" Sardiñas Quián — singer
Jon Secada — singer
Sen Dog — rapper and member of Cypress Hill
Gustavo Tamayo — güiro player with the groundbreaking band of Israel "Cachao" López
Bebo Valdés — pianist
Carlos "Patato" Valdes — conga player and composer 
Chucho Valdés — pianist and leader of Irakere, son of Bebo Valdés
Javier Vázquez — songwriter, arranger, and pianist with Sonora Matancera; son of Pablo "Bubú" Vázquez Gobín and brother of Elpidio Vázquez, he succeeded Lino Frías on piano as a member of Sonora Matancera
María Teresa Vera — guitarist, singer and composer 
Lupe Victoria "La Lupe" Yolí Raymond — singer 
Yusa — female bassist

Politics
Salvador Valdés Mesa — First Vice President of Cuba, former trade union leader, Political Bureau of the Communist Party of Cuba
Juan Almeida Bosque — politician and composer
Víctor Dreke — Cuban revolutionary and second-in-command to Ernesto "Che" Guevara in the Congo 
Juan Gualberto Gómez — 1890s revolutionary leader, close collaborator of José Martí; served as a member of the committee of consultations that drafted and amended the Constitution of 1901 and as a Representative and Senator
Mariana Grajales — part of the Cuban Independence War; Antonio Maceo's mother
Esteban Lazo Hernández — politician
Antonio Maceo — 1890s revolutionary leader
Jorge Luis García Pérez — human rights activist
Rafael Serra — writer and political journalist 
Harry "Pombo" Villegas — Cuban Communist guerilla
Enrique Tarrio — far-right activist and leader of the far right Proud Boys movement

Science
Arnaldo Tamayo Méndez — cosmonaut; first Latin American and first person of African descent in outer space

Sports
Aroldis Chapman — MLB
Gilbert Arenas — NBA
Javier Arenas (American football) — NFL
Yoel Romero — Olympic wrestler and mixed martial artist
Hector Lombard — Olympic Judoka
Alexis Vila — Olympic wrestler
Bert Campaneris — MLB, cousin of José Cardenal
José Cardenal — MLB
Joel Casamayor — boxer; WBC Lightweight Champion
José Contreras — MLB
Martín Dihigo — Negro leagues, Baseball Hall of Fame
Yuniel Dorticos - Boxer:two-time cruiserweight world champion, having held the WBA title from 2017 to 2018 and the IBF title from 2019 to September 2020.
Juan Carlos Gómez — boxer; former WBC Cruiserweight Champion
Liván Hernández — MLB, half-brother of El Duque
Orlando "El Duque" Hernández — MLB
Yoan Pablo Hernández — professional boxer; he held the unified IBF and Ring magazine cruiserweight titles between 2011 and 2015, as well as the WBA interim cruiserweight title in 2011.
Kid Chocolate — boxer; former World Featherweight and Junior Lightweight Champion
Orestes Kindelán — most prolific home run hitter in the history of amateur Cuban baseball
Minnie Miñoso — MLB
José Nápoles — boxer; former World Welterweight Champion; also known as "Mantequilla" Nápoles
Sergio Oliva — only bodybuilder to have ever beaten Arnold Schwarzenegger in a Mr. Olympia competition
Tony Oliva — MLB, three time batting champion
Luis Ortiz — professional heavyweight boxer and former WBA Heavyweight Champion
Brayan Peña — MLB
Tony Pérez — MLB Hall of Fame
Anthony Echemendia — amateur wrestler
Juan Pizarro — MLB
Yasiel Puig — MLB
Ana Fidelia Quirot — athlete
Alexei Ramírez — MLB
Sugar Ramos — boxer; former WBA Featherweight Champion
Alexis Rubalcaba — amateur boxer
Félix Savón — amateur boxer
Javier Sotomayor — world record holder in high jump
Teófilo Stevenson — amateur boxer
Luis Tiant — MLB
Regla Torres — volleyball player
Cristóbal Torriente — Negro leagues, Baseball Hall of Fame
Jorge Orta — MLB
 Odisnel Cooper
 Yordany Álvarez
 Alexis Copello
 Pedro Pichardo
 Havana Solaun
 Julio César La Cruz

See also

Afro-Latin Americans – Latin America
Black Latino Americans – the United States
Cabildo (Cuba)
Emancipados
Haitian Cuban
MPLA
Angolan Civil War
Afro-Cuban jazz

Footnotes

Further reading

 Arnedo-Gómez, Miguel. "Introduction", Writing Rumba: The Afrocubanista Movement in		Poetry.	Charlottesville: University of Virginia Press. 2006: 1-170.
 Duno-Gottberg, Luis, . Madrid, Iberoamericana – Frankfurt am Main, Vervuert, 2003.
 Finch, Aisha and Fannie Rushing (eds.), Breaing the Chains Forging the Nation: The Afro-Cuban Fight for Freedom and Equality. Baton Rouge, LA: Louisiana State University Press, 2019.
 García, Cristina. "Introduction", Cubanismo! New York: Vintage Books, 2002: 1-364.
 "Literature of the Recolutionary Era", Encyclopedia of Cuba: People, history, culture. Ed. Luis	Martinez Ternandez 1st Vol. Wesport: Greenwood Press, 2003: 345-346.
 Henken, Ted. "Cuban Literature-The Avant-Garde vs the Vanguard: Colonial Literature,"	Cuba:	A Global Studies Handbook Global Studies :Latin America & The Caribbean. Santa	Barbara: ABC_CLIO, 2008: 363-385.
 Moore, Robin D. "The Minorista vanguard: Moderism and Afrocubanismo" Nationalizing	Blackness: Afrocubansimo and artistic Revolution in Havana, 1920-1940.Pittsburg:	University of Pittsburgh Press, 1997: 195-200.
 Ródriguez-Mangual, Edna M. "Introduction" Lydia Cabrera and the Construction of an Afro	Cuban Cultural Identity. Chapel Hill: The University of North Carolina Press, 2004: 1-167.
 "Afrocubanismo", Encyclopedia of World Literature in the 20th Century.  Ed. Lenard S. Klein.  2nd	ed. 4thvol. Continuum: Continuum Publishing Company, 1989: 20-21.

 
Cuban
Society of Cuba
Ethnic groups in Cuba
 
Cuban
Cuban entertainers